Sweden Democrat Youth (SDU) was the youth league of the Swedish political party Sweden Democrats until 12 September 2015.

Background 
The youth league was founded in 1993 as an independent youth league to its parent party. The youth league was disbanded in 1995 due to rampant problems with neo-Nazism in the ranks, but was reestablished as an independent organization in 1998 before becoming directly associated to the Sweden Democrats. Sweden Democrats leader Jimmie Akesson served as chairman of the youth wing until 2005.

Conflict with the Sweden Democrats 
In 2015, the SDU was threatened with dissociation by the Sweden Democrats after some of its members had were said to have expressed racist statements and its leadership were accused of collaborating with extremist groups such as the neo-fascist Nordic Youth. SDU's leader Gustav Kasselstrand, and its deputy leader William Hahne, were expelled from the party on 27 April 2015 due to this. They both denied the accusations of relations with extremist groups, and claimed that SD's parliamentary group leader Mattias Karlsson wanted to remove them after Hahne defeated the mother party leadership's preferred candidate for the SD chairmanship in Stockholm. Both Hahne and Kasselstrand had also supported Jessica Ohlson for the position of SDU chairperson. The Sweden Democrats had considered Ohlson too radical and had endorsed Tobias Andersson for the position. Ohlson was subsequently elected leader of the SDU in 2015.

The Sweden Democrats subsequently announced that they would break ties with the youth league after an extended conflict with Ohlson's supporters and multiple controversies surrounding SDU members. The party leadership issued a timetable for members of the youth wing to dissociate themselves with the SDU or risk expulsion from the Sweden Democrats while Ohlson announced she would lead the SDU as an independent youth league. The leading members of SDU would then go on to form the right-wing populist party Alternative for Sweden in March 2018.

On 1 October 2015, the Sweden Democrats founded a new youth league, Young Swedes SDU.

Chairmen of the SDU 
 Jimmy Windeskog (1998–2000)
 Jimmie Åkesson (2000–05)
 Martin Kinnunen (2005–07)
 Erik Almqvist (2007–10)
 William Petzäll (2010–11)
 Gustav Kasselstrand (2011–15)
 Jessica Ohlson (2015–)

See also
 Finns Party Youth

References 

Youth wings of political parties in Sweden
Youth organizations established in 1993
1993 establishments in Sweden